Elections to Lewisham London Borough Council were held in May 1968. The whole council was up for election. Turnout was 34.4%. This election had aldermen as well as councillors. Labour and the Conservatives each got five aldermen. As of the 2022 elections, this election was the last time the Conservatives controlled Lewisham Borough Council.

Election result

|}

Results by ward

Bellingham

Blackheath & Lewisham Village

Brockley

Culverley

Deptford

Drake

Forest Hill

Grinling Gibbons

Grove Park

Honor Oak Park

Ladywell

Lewisham Park

Manor Lee

Marlowe

Pepys

Rushey Green

St Andrew

St Mildred Lee

South Lee

Southend

Sydenham East

Sydenham West

Whitefoot

By-elections between 1968 and 1971
There were no by-elections.

References

1968
1968 London Borough council elections